Helen Reddy's Greatest Hits is a compilation album by Australian-American pop singer Helen Reddy. It was released in 1975 by Capitol Records.

Release and reception 
On December 5, 1975, the Recording Industry Association of America awarded the album with Gold certification for sales of 500,000 copies in the United States, and both Platinum and Double Platinum certifications were issued on February 5, 1992. The album debuted on Billboards Top LP's & Tapes chart in the issue dated the day following Gold certification, December 6, 1975, and made it to number five during its 51 weeks there. In Canada's RPM magazine it reached number 9, and on the album chart in the UK (where it was renamed The Best of Helen Reddy) it matched its number five US showing.

In 1987 an expanded edition that was given the title Helen Reddy's Greatest Hits (And More) was the first release of the original compilation on compact disc, and on April 14, 1997, that edition was reissued with the title Love Songs.

Track listingSide 1 "I Am Woman" (Ray Burton, Helen Reddy) – 3:24
 "I Don't Know How to Love Him" (Tim Rice, Andrew Lloyd Webber) – 3:15
 "Leave Me Alone (Ruby Red Dress)" (Linda Laurie) – 3:26
 "Delta Dawn" (Larry Collins, Alex Harvey) – 3:08
 "You and Me Against the World" (Kenny Ascher, Paul Williams) – 3:08Side 2 "Angie Baby" (Alan O'Day) – 3:29
 "Emotion" (Patti Dahlstrom, Véronique Sanson) – 4:10
 "Keep On Singing" (Bobby Hart, Danny Janssen) – 3:03
 "Peaceful" (Kenny Rankin) – 2:50
 "Ain't No Way to Treat a Lady" (Harriet Schock) – 3:26CD Bonus Tracks'
 "Somewhere in the Night" (Will Jennings, Richard Kerr) – 3:31
 "I Can't Hear You No More" (Gerry Goffin, Carole King) – 2:48
 "You're My World" (Umberto Bindi, Gino Paoli, Carl Sigman) – 2:45
 "The Happy Girls" (Kim Fowley, Rick Henn, Earle Mankey, Helen Reddy) – 4:00
 "Make Love to Me" (Michael Tinsley, Steven Voice, Peter Yellowstone) – 3:49

Charts

Weekly charts

Year-end charts

Certifications

Personnel

Helen Reddy – vocals
Jeff Wald – management
Francesco Scavullo – photography
Roy Kohara – art direction
LP release
Tom Catalano – producer (except as noted)
Larry Marks – producer ("I Don't Know How to Love Him")
 Jay Senter  – producer ("I Am Woman")
Joe Wissert – producer ("Angie Baby", "Emotion", "Ain't No Way to Treat a Lady")
CD bonus tracks
Frank Day – producer ("Make Love to Me")
Kim Fowley – producer ("You're My World", "The Happy Girls")
Earle Mankey – producer ("You're My World", "The Happy Girls")
Joe Wissert – producer ("Somewhere in the Night", "I Can't Hear You No More")

Notes

References

1975 greatest hits albums
Capitol Records albums
Helen Reddy albums
Albums produced by Joe Wissert
Albums produced by Tom Catalano